Daphne Koller (born August 27, 1968) is an Israeli-American computer scientist. She was a professor in the department of computer science at Stanford University and a MacArthur Foundation fellowship recipient. She is one of the founders of Coursera, an online education platform. Her general research area is artificial intelligence and its applications in the biomedical sciences. Koller was featured in a 2004 article by MIT Technology Review titled "10 Emerging Technologies That Will Change Your World" concerning the topic of Bayesian machine learning.

Education
Koller received a bachelor's degree from the Hebrew University of Jerusalem in 1985, at the age of 17, and a master's degree from the same institution in 1986, at the age of 18. She completed her PhD at Stanford in 1993 under the supervision of Joseph Halpern.

Career and research

After her PhD, Koller did postdoctoral research at University of California, Berkeley from 1993 to 1995 under Stuart J. Russell, and joined the faculty of the Stanford University computer science department in 1995. She was named a MacArthur Fellow in 2004. She was elected a member of the National Academy of Engineering in 2011 for contributions to representation, inference, and learning in probabilistic models with applications to robotics, vision, and biology. She was also elected a fellow of the American Academy of Arts and Sciences in 2014.

In April 2008, Koller was awarded the first ever $150,000 ACM-Infosys Foundation Award in Computing Sciences.

She and Andrew Ng, a fellow Stanford computer science professor in the AI lab, founded Coursera in 2012. She served as the co-CEO with Ng, and then as president of Coursera. She was recognized for her contributions to online education by being named one of Newsweeks 10 Most Important People in 2010, Time magazine's 100 Most Influential People in 2012, and Fast Companys Most Creative People in 2014.

She left Coursera in 2016 to become chief computing officer at Calico. In 2018, she left Calico to start and lead Insitro, a drug discovery startup.

Koller is primarily interested in representation, inference, learning, and decision making, with a focus on applications to computer vision and computational biology. Along with Suchi Saria and Anna Penn of Stanford University, Koller developed PhysiScore, which uses various data elements to predict whether premature babies are likely to have health issues.

In 2009, she published a textbook on probabilistic graphical models together with Nir Friedman. She offered a free online course on the subject starting in February 2012.

Her former doctoral students include Lise Getoor, Mehran Sahami, Suchi Saria, Eran Segal, and Ben Taskar.

Koller was interviewed by BBC Radio 4 on The Life Scientific broadcast on 27 September 2022.

Honors and awards
Her honors and awards include:
 1994: Arthur Samuel Thesis Award
 1996: Sloan Foundation Faculty Fellowship
 1998: Office of Naval Research Young Investigator Award
 1999: Presidential Early Career Award for Scientists and Engineers (PECASE)
 2001: IJCAI Computers and Thought Award
 2003: Cox Medal at Stanford
 2004: MacArthur Fellow
 2004: Oswald G. Villard Fellow for Undergraduate Teaching at Stanford University
 2007: ACM Prize in Computing
 2008: ACM/Infosys Award
 2010: Newsweeks 10 Most Important People
 2010: Huffington Post 100 Game Changers
 2011: Elected to National Academy of Engineering
 2013: Time magazine's 100 Most Influential People
 2014: Elected fellow of the American Academy of Arts and Sciences
 2014: Fast Companys Most Creative People in Business<ref>{{cite web|url=https://www.fastcompany.com/person/daphne-koller|title=Fast Companys Most Creative People in Business|website=fastcompany.com|access-date=2016-10-27|archive-date=2019-05-30|archive-url=https://web.archive.org/web/20190530214118/https://www.fastcompany.com/person/daphne-koller|url-status=dead}}</ref>
 2017: Elected ISCB Fellow by the International Society for Computational Biology (ISCB)
 2019: ACM-AAAI Allen Newell Award for contributions with significant breadth across computing, or that bridge computer science and other disciplines 

 Books 

Koller's book authorships include:

 Koller contributed one chapter to the 2018 book Architects of Intelligence: The Truth About AI from the People Building it by the American futurist Martin Ford.
 Probabilistic Graphical Models: Principles and Techniques'' by Daphne Koller and Nir Friedman.

Personal life
Koller is married to Dan Avida, a venture capitalist at Opus Capital.

References

1968 births
Living people
MacArthur Fellows
Artificial intelligence researchers
Stanford University alumni
American roboticists
Women roboticists
Fellows of the Association for the Advancement of Artificial Intelligence
Stanford University School of Engineering faculty
American women computer scientists
Women statisticians
20th-century American Jews
Members of the United States National Academy of Engineering
American bioinformaticians
Fellows of the International Society for Computational Biology
Fellows of the American Academy of Arts and Sciences
Recipients of the ACM Prize in Computing
Israeli Jews
21st-century American Jews
20th-century American women
21st-century American women